Max Bloesch (also Blösch; 27 June 1908 – 9 August 1997) was a Swiss field handball player who competed in the 1936 Summer Olympics.

He was part of the Swiss field handball team, which won the bronze medal. He played one match.

Later in life, he was a conservationist who helped the population of storks in Switzerland rebound. For his work as "Father Stork" he was awarded an honorary doctorate from the University of Bern.

External links
Max Blösch's profile at databaseOlympics

1908 births
1997 deaths
Field handball players at the 1936 Summer Olympics
Olympic bronze medalists for Switzerland
Olympic handball players of Switzerland
Swiss male handball players
Olympic medalists in handball
Swiss conservationists
Medalists at the 1936 Summer Olympics